Prichard is an unincorporated community in Shoshone County, Idaho, United States.

History
A post office called Prichard was established in 1910, and remained in operation until 1943. The community derived its name from Andrew J. Prichard, a gold prospector.

References

External links

Unincorporated communities in Shoshone County, Idaho
Unincorporated communities in Idaho